Humania may refer to:

 Humania (communication project), a communication project with development purposes
 Humania (album), a 2011 album by Nico Touches the Walls